Hudo is a village in the Municipality of Tržič in the Upper Carniola region of Slovenia.

Name
Hudo was attested in written records  1400 as zu Chudein, and as Chudm in 1498. The name is derived from the adjective hud 'poor, meager', referring to the soil quality.

Geography
Hudo is a scattered village on a ridge and slopes above the Hudo Basin and Hudo Woods. Water is supplied from a catchwork below Mount Vaško.

References

External links 

Hudo at Geopedia

Populated places in the Municipality of Tržič